Mohammad Farhadi (born 1 January 1949) is an Iranian physician, politician and former Minister of Science, a position he held from 26 November 2014 until 20 August 2017. He was previously President of the Red Crescent Society of the Islamic Republic of Iran from 2013 to 2014, Minister of Health from 1997 to 2001 in the first cabinet of President Mohammad Khatami, Minister of Culture and Higher Education from 1985 to 1989 in the second cabinet of Mir-Hossein Mousavi and President of the University of Tehran in 1985. He was also Vice President of the Red Crescent Society of the Islamic Republic of Iran in the first years of 1980's.

References

External links

1949 births
Living people
Islamic Association of Iranian Medical Society politicians
Secretaries-General of political parties in Iran
Ministers of science of Iran
Iranian Science and Culture Hall of Fame recipients in Medicine